Juaboso-Bodi District is a former district that was located in Western Region, Ghana. Originally it was formerly part of the then-larger Juaboso-Bia District from 1988, which was created from the former Sefwi-Bibiani District Council, until the northwest part of the district was split off to create Bia District in August 2004; thus the remaining part has been renamed as Juaboso-Bodi District. However, on 28 June 2012, it was split off into two new districts: Juaboso District (capital: Juaboso) and Bodi District (capital: Bodi). The district assembly was located in the northwest part of Western Region and had Juaboso as its capital town.

References

Districts of the Western North Region